Ice buko, also known as buko ice candy or coconut popsicle, is a Filipino frozen dessert made from condensed milk, young coconut (buko) strips, and coconut water. It is basically a frozen version of the buko salad. They can be sold on popsicle sticks or in plastic bags as ice candy. They commonly include other ingredients like peanuts, pinipig (toasted young rice), macapuno, pandan leaf extracts, various fruits, or sweetened mung beans (or adzuki beans). They are popular desserts during the summer and are commonly sold by sari-sari stores and sorbeteros.

See also
 Buko salad
 Halo-halo
 Ice scramble
 Lamaw
 Sorbetes

References

Philippine desserts
Ice-based desserts
Foods containing coconut